A triple bond in chemistry is a chemical bond between two atoms involving six bonding electrons instead of the usual two in a covalent single bond. Triple bonds are stronger than the equivalent single bonds or double bonds, with a bond order of three. The most common triple bond is in a nitrogen N2 molecule; the second most common is that between two carbon atoms, which can be found in alkynes. Other functional groups containing a triple bond are cyanides and isocyanides. Some diatomic molecules, such as dinitrogen and carbon monoxide, are also triple bonded. In skeletal formulae the triple bond is drawn as three parallel lines (≡) between the two connected atoms.

Bonding
The types of bonding can be explained in terms of orbital hybridization. In the case of acetylene each carbon atom has two sp-orbitals and two p-orbitals. The two sp-orbitals  are linear with 180° angles and occupy the x-axis (cartesian coordinate system). The p-orbitals are perpendicular on the y-axis and the z-axis. When the carbon atoms approach each other, the sp orbitals overlap to form an sp-sp sigma bond. At the same time the pz-orbitals approach and together they form a pz-pz pi-bond. Likewise, the other pair of py-orbitals form a  py-py pi-bond. The result is formation of one sigma bond and two pi bonds.

In the bent bond model, the triple bond can also formed by the overlapping of three sp3 lobes without the need to invoke a pi-bond.

Triple bonds between elements heavier than oxygen

Many elements beyond oxygen can form triple bonds. They are common for transition metals. Hexa(tert-butoxy)ditungsten(III) and Hexa(tert-butoxy)dimolybdenum(III) are well known examples. The M-M distance is about 233 pm.  The W2 compound has attracted particular attention for its reactions with alkynes, leading to metal-carbon triple bonded compounds of the formula RC≡W(OBut)3

References

Chemical bonding